Bugakov (masculine) or Bugakova (feminine) is a Russian surname. Notable people with the surname include:

Danil Bugakov (born 1988), Uzbekistani swimmer
Dmitri Bugakov (born 1979), Russian footballer
Mariya Bugakova (born 1985), Uzbekistani swimmer

Russian-language surnames